The 2009 World Thoroughbred Rankings was the 2009 edition of the World Thoroughbred Rankings. It was an assessment of Thoroughbred racehorses issued by the International Federation of Horseracing Authorities (IFHA) in January 2010. It included horses aged three or older which competed in flat races during 2009. It was open to all horses irrespective of where they raced or were trained.

This year's highest rating was awarded to Sea the Stars for his performance in the Irish Champion Stakes. He was given a rating of 136. A total of 333 horses were included in the list, 45 more than the previous year.

Full rankings for 2009
 For a detailed guide to this table, see below.

Top ranked horses
The following table shows the top ranked horses overall, the top three-year-olds, the top older horses and the top fillies and mares in the 2009 Rankings. It also shows the leading performers in various subdivisions of each group, which are defined by the distances of races, and the surfaces on which they are run.

Guide
A complete guide to the main table above.

References

World Thoroughbred Racehorse Rankings
World Thoroughbred Rankings 2009